Dominique Bucchini, born on January 24, 1943, in Sartène (Corse-du-Sud), is a French politician. Member of the French Communist Party (PCF), he was the mayor of Sartène, MEP and president of the Corsican Assembly.

Biography 
Dominique Bucchini was born on January 24, 1943, in Sartène. He spent his childhood in Corsica.

He was a teacher in Vendée, then he went in cooperation to Thiès, as a history-geography teacher until 1971. There he led the football section of the Thiès student club. In 1971, the Senegalese government of the time informed him that he was becoming undesirable. He then left the country to practice his profession first in Montreuil then at the agricultural school of Sartène. In 1972, he joined the Communist Party.

He was the MEP for the PCF of September 28, 1981, to July 23, 1984. He was then part of the committee on youth, culture, education, information and sports. He was also the mayor of Sartène (from 1977 to 2001) and general councilor of Corse-du-Sud for the canton of Sartène.

In 1996, he was the victim of an assassination attempt because of his positions against the various forms of racketeering.

He led the list Left Front to the Corsican regional elections of 2010 where it collects 10.02% of votes in the 1st round. He was present in the second round in third position on the list of union of the left led by Paul Giacobbi. He is elected president of the Corsican Assembly during the third ballot.

Dominique Bucchini is married and the father of two children: Julien and Jean-Simon.

Distinction 

In 2016, Dominique Bucchini was elevated to the rank of Officer of the Legion of Honour.

References 

1943 births
Living people
French politicians
French Communist Party politicians
Corsican politicians
MEPs for France 1979–1984